Ekaterina Igorevna Konstantinova (born 13 October 1995) is a Russian short track speed skater. She competed in the 2018 Winter Olympics.

References

External links

1995 births
Living people
Russian female short track speed skaters
Olympic short track speed skaters of Russia
Short track speed skaters at the 2018 Winter Olympics
Sportspeople from Saint Petersburg
21st-century Russian women